Empire Plaza may refer to:
 Empire State Plaza, a complex of state government buildings in Albany, New York, United States
 Empire Square, a city square in Lisbon, Portugal